"The Boys in the Old Brighton Blue" was a single released by the English football team Brighton & Hove Albion to commemorate reaching the 1983 FA Cup Final.  It reached number 65 in the UK Singles Chart.

References

1983 singles
Football songs and chants
1983 songs
Song articles with missing songwriters